Campagna internment camp, located in Campagna, a town near Salerno in Southern Italy, was an internment camp for Jews and foreigners established by Benito Mussolini in 1940.

The first internees were 430 men captured in different parts of Italy. Most of them were Jewish refugees came from Germany, Austria, Poland, Czechoslovakia and Dalmatia, there were also some British citizens and a group of 40 French and Italian Jews. The number of inmates during the three years varied considerably, ranging between 230 (February 1941) and 150 (September 1943).

The camp was never a concentration camp in the German sense of the term. Internees were allowed to receive food parcels and visit sick relatives. In addition, there were no mail restrictions. None of the internees was killed or subjected to violence. In fact, the internees were constantly protected from deportation to Germany, as the Nazis requested. Prisoners were allowed to organisee a library, school, theatre and a synagogue.

All of the prisoners were free to move through the streets and houses of the town, as they were welcomed by the inhabitants of Campagna as friends. Such bonds of friendship were created that many prisoners had lunch at the home of local friends. That also involved Mayor Carlino D'Ambrosio and the local fascist authorities, who kept the activities hidden from the higher authorities. 
	
An essential role was played by the Bishop of Campagna, Giuseppe Maria Palatucci, and his nephew Giovanni Palatucci, Quaestor of Fiume, who, by sending as many Istrian Jews as possible into the Campagna camp, saved thousands from the death camps.

In September 1943, Italy capitulated and the Allied troops invaded Southern Italy. In response, the German troops invaded Italy from the North. However, when they got to the Campagna concentration camp, all the inmates had already fled to the mountains with the help of the local inhabitants.

See also
 Holocaust in Italy
 List of Italian concentration camps

References

External links

Campagna e gli Ebrei di Monsignor Palatucci 
Official web site af Associazione Giovanni Palatucci 
27 gennaio 2010 "Giorno della Memoria" a Trieste presso la Scuola Agenti di Polizia, Carcere Coroneo e Risiera di San Sabba 

1940s in Italy
Italian fascist internment camps in Italy